DWDY (1107 AM) is a radio station owned and operated by Northeastern Broadcasting Services. The station's studio and transmitter are located in Isabela Hotel, Brgy. Minante 1, Cauayan, Isabela.

References

Radio stations in Isabela (province)
Radio stations established in 1990